Syzygium symingtonianum is a species of plant in the family Myrtaceae. It is endemic to Peninsular Malaysia.

References

symingtonianum
Endemic flora of Peninsular Malaysia
Taxonomy articles created by Polbot
Plants described in 1947
Taxobox binomials not recognized by IUCN